The Georgetown Relief Society Hall in Georgetown, Idaho was built in 1872.  It was listed on the National Register of Historic Places in 1998.

It has also been known as the First Public Building, the D.U.P. Hall, and the First LDS Chapel. 

It was moved to its current location in 1896.

References

Clubhouses on the National Register of Historic Places in Idaho
Buildings and structures completed in 1872
Bear Lake County, Idaho
19th-century Latter Day Saint church buildings
Relief Society buildings
Properties of religious function on the National Register of Historic Places in Idaho